The following is a list of Illinois Fighting Illini head football coaches.  The Illinois Fighting Illini football team has had 28 individuals that have maintained the title of head coach.  The current head coach is Bret Bielema.

*Hall, Lindgren, Lowenthal and Matthews shared the title of "Head Coach" for the 1904 season.
**Zook was fired at the end of the regular season; defensive coordinator Vic Koenning was appointed as interim head coach and coached Illinois in the Kraft Fight Hunger Bowl.
***Cubit served as interim coach for the most of the 2015 regular season after Tim Beckman was terminated in August 2015, one week before the season-opening game. The "Interim" portion of Cubit's title was removed on November 28, 2015, a few hours before the last game of the season, and he was named permanent head coach—a tenure that lasted exactly one game, as the following March he was relieved of duties in favor of Lovie Smith by new Athletic Director Josh Whitman.
****Rod Smith served as interim coach for the final game of the 2020 season after Lovie Smith was terminated in December 2020.

Hall of fame
Illinois has had five coaches inducted into the College Football Foundation Hall of Fame. Edward K. Hall (1892-1893), George Woodruff (1903), Robert Zuppke (1913-1941), Bob Blackman (1971-1976) and Pete Elliott (1960-1966).

References

Illinois Fighting Illini

Illinois Fighting Illini head football coaches